Philcoxia minensis is a rare annual herb of the family Plantaginaceae, that is endemic to the Serra do Cabral area of the Brazilian state Minas Gerais. It was discovered April 17, 1981 by David philcox.  in the municipality of Joaquim Felício and grew near other plants from the campos rupestres (rocky fields) montane savanna. The exact location of collection was unspecified. The species has been shown to produce phosphatases.

Its leaves possess small glands that are capable of trapping and digesting nematodes, defining it as a carnivorous plant.

References 

Flora of Brazil
Plantaginaceae
Plants described in 2000
Carnivorous plants of South America